Farid Diaf (born 14 April 1971 in France) is a French retired footballer and coach.

England

Described as a 'breath of fresh air' by Preston North End coach David Moyes, Diaf injured himself in training two days before the 1999/00 season began. Unfortunately, on the 6th of November at Colchester, he suffered a fracture under his left eye, so had to undergo an operation. Despite turning out with the reserves and expressing eagerness to get back on the field, the half-back was ruled out of action again with a January injury, posting three league appearances the entire season.

Asked about Preston North End, the Frenchman stated that the team, as well as the manager, exuded talent and that they could potentially produce football similar to Manchester United, who were one division above. He also claimed that the standard was higher than in France.

References

External links 
 Actufoot tag 
 
 
 
 French Wikipedia Page

Expatriate footballers in England
1971 births
Preston North End F.C. players
French football managers
French footballers
Living people
Association football midfielders
Boston United F.C. players
French expatriate footballers